Westmeath Intermediate Football Championship is an annual Gaelic Athletic Association competition organised by Westmeath GAA between Gaelic football clubs in County Westmeath. The winner of the competition qualifies to represent the county in the Leinster Intermediate Club Football Championship, the winner of which progresses to the All-Ireland Intermediate Club Football Championship.

The top club is promoted to the Westmeath Senior Football Championship, while the bottom club is relegated to the Westmeath Junior Football Championship.

History
In its early years, the competition was more transitional, with Caulry winning against Tyrrellspass in the 1946 IFC final and qualifying for the senior championship in the same year.

The 1973 final was held at Páirc Chiaráin in Athlone, the first major championship final held there in more than two decades.

Garrycastle won the 1997 final (after a replay), four years before they went on to win the senior championship.

The 1999 final required three games to separate the teams.

Pat Flanagan, later manager of the senior Westmeath county team, was in charge of Kilbeggan Shamrocks when they won the 2000 final.

Ballinagore won the 2007 competition, following on from winning the Westmeath and Leinster junior titles of two years previously.

Maryland won the 2008 final (after a replay, which went to extra-time), having earlier linked up with Marty Whelan to win Celebrity Bainisteoir. Kieran Martin scored a goal in the drawn game. It was Martin who scored the decisive solo goal in the inaugural Tailteann Cup final, winning that title for Westmeath fourteen years later. Back in 2008, Maryland won an in IFC final at the tenth effort (if replays are counted) since the club last won the title in 1980.

Tubberclair defeated Ballynacargy in the 2009 final, then went on to the Leinster Intermediate Football Championship final.

Jack Cooney was manager of Coralstown/Kinnegad when the club won the 2011 final against Castletown-Finea/Coole/Whitehall.

Former Roscommon player Francie Grehan managed Caulry to the 2014 title.

The 2017 champions were St Mary's Rochfortbridge, who had been promoted for 2008 after winning the Westmeath Junior Football Championship.

Qualification for subsequent competitions

Leinster Intermediate Club Football Championship
The Westmeath IFC winner qualifies for the Leinster Intermediate Club Football Championship. It is the only team from County Westmeath to qualify for this competition. The Westmeath IFC winner may enter the Leinster Intermediate Club Football Championship at either the preliminary round or the quarter-final stage.

All-Ireland Intermediate Club Football Championship
The Westmeath IFC winner — by winning the Leinster Intermediate Club Football Championship — may qualify for the All-Ireland Intermediate Club Football Championship, at which it would enter at the __ stage, providing it hasn't been drawn to face the British champions in the quarter-finals.

Roll of honour (incomplete)
See here
021}}</ref>
 2022: Shandonagh
 2021: Tang
 2020: Moate All Whites
 2019: Caulry
 2018: Shandonagh
 2017: St Mary's Rochfortbridge
 2016: Rosemount
 2015: Athlone 
 2014: Caulry
 2013: St Malachy's 
 2012: Castletown/Coole/Finea/Whitehall
 2011: Coralstown-Kinnegad
 2010: Bunbrosna
 2009: Tubberclair
 2008: Maryland
 2007: Ballinagore
 2006: Bunbrosna
 2005: Killucan
 2004: St Mary's Rochfortbridge
 2003: Ballymore
 2002: Tubberclair
 2001: St Malachys
 2000: Kilbeggan Shamrocks
 1999: Ballynacargy
 1998: Ballymore
 1997: Garrycastle
 1996: Ballynacargy
 1995: St Mary's Rochfortbridge
1994: Castledaly
1993: Tang
1992: Killucan
1991: Tyrellspass
1990: Tang
1989: St Paul's
1988: Mullingar Shamrocks
1987: Ballynacargy
1986: Ballinagore
1985: Caulry
1984: Ballymore
1983: Tyrellspass
1982: Tang
1981: Milltownpass
1980: Maryland
1979: Tubberclair
1978: St Mary's Rochfortbridge
1977: St Paul's
1976: Castletown Finea
1975: St Malachy's
1974: Kilbeggan 
1973: Tang
1972: Ballymore
1971: Bunbrosna
1970: St Finians
1969: Caulry
1968:
1967:
1966: No Competition
1967: No Competition
1966: No Competition
1965: No Competition
1964: No Competition
1963: No Competition
1962: No Competition
1958: St Mary's Rochfortbridge
1950: The Downs
1946: Caulry

References

http://archives.tcm.ie/irishexaminer/1999/08/11/results.htm
http://www.westmeathexaminer.ie/story.asp?stID=585&cid=199&cid2= 
http://www.westmeathexaminer.ie/story.asp?stID=617 
http://ballinagore.westmeath.gaa.ie/
http://westmeath.gaa.ie/

2
Intermediate Gaelic football county championships